Au Bon Climat is a U.S.-based winery, founded in 1982.  The winery is located in Santa Maria, California and produces over 30,000 cases of wine annually, including Pinot noir, Chardonnay, Pinot blanc and Pinot gris varietals. According to the winery's website, the primary source for Au Bon Climat's grapes is the Bien Nacido Vineyards, in northern Santa Barbara County.  Au Bon Climat also sources grapes from the Le Bon Climat Vineyard, the Sanford & Benedict Vineyard, and San Luis Obispo County's Talley Vineyards. Au Bon Climat's winemaker, founder and owner was Jim Clendenen.

External links
Au Bon Climat Website

Wineries in California
Santa Maria, California
Companies based in Santa Barbara County, California